Northampton Spencer F.C. was a football club based in Northampton, England. Their ground was  Kingsthorpe Mill. They played in the United Counties League Division One.

History
Northampton Spencer FC was founded in 1936 as Spencer School Old Boys, from members of the old school team. In 1968, the club joined the United Counties League, and immediately earned promotion after finishing as runners-up. After starting their UCL life at Dallington Park, the club moved to Duston High School for two years before arriving at its current home at Kingsthorpe Mill in 1971. Spencer was relegated in 1981 and twelve months later finished at the foot of Division One. Fortunes were transformed by the arrival of ex-Northampton Town boss John Petts as manager and he led the Millers back to the Premier Division in 1985. Since then, Spencer has been one of the stronger sides in the league, rarely finishing out of the top ten, and winning the championship in 1991–92 with 101 points.
At the end of the 2011/12, Spencer requested demotion after revenue streams dried up.
The club spent three season in Division One under the management of Ben Stone, before regaining their Premier Division status for the 2015/16 season
On 4 April 2015 Spencer successfully secured promotion back to the Premier Division with a convincing 3-1 away win at Olney. This was followed by 2-0 victory over local rivals ON Chenecks on 6 April sealing the UCL Division 1 title with 3 games to spare. 2015/16 was Spencer's last season because their chairman retired.

Honours
United Counties League Premier Division
Champions 1991–92
Runners-up 1992–93, 1997–98
Runners-up 1968–69 (then called Division One), 1984–85

Records
FA Cup
Second Qualifying Round 1999–2000, 2009–10
FA Vase
Fourth Round 1987–88

References

External links
Northampton Spencer official website

Football clubs in England
Sport in Northampton
Association football clubs established in 1936
United Counties League
Defunct football clubs in Northamptonshire
1936 establishments in England
Association football clubs disestablished in 2016